Charles Marie Émile Seurre or Seurre the Younger (22  February 1798 – 11 January 1858) was a French sculptor.

Life 
Seurre was born and died in Paris.  A student of the sculptor Pierre Cartellier, in 1824 Émile Seurre won the Prix de Rome for sculpture with a relief on the subject Joseph's tunic brought back to Jacob. Like his elder brother Bernard Seurre, he took part in spreading the Napoleonic legend and is best known for his series of statues of 'great men'.

Works 

 Napoleon I (1833), standing statue, bronze, Paris, Hôtel des Invalides, cour d'honneur
 Napoléon I, standing statue (smaller version), bronze, Versailles, châteaux de Versailles et de Trianon
 The Navy, allegorical figure, Paris, Arc de Triomphe de l'Étoile, under the arc de triomphe, north spandrel
 Talent, statue, Paris, Père Lachaise Cemetery, tomb of Pierre Cartellier, left side
 A stela with three veiled figures, bas-relief, Paris, cimetière du Père-Lachaise, tomb of Pierre Cartellier, to the right of the tomb
 Portrait of Hugues Quiéret, admiral of France (died 1340) (1840), bust, plaster, Versailles, châteaux de Versailles et de Trianon
 Saint Louis, standing statue, Versailles, châteaux de Versailles et de Trianon
 Gaston de Foix, duc de Nemours (1489 - 1512) (1842), standing statue, marble, Versailles, châteaux de Versailles et de Trianon
 Charles VII, standing statue, marble, Versailles, châteaux de Versailles et de Trianon
 Statue of the young Romain at the musée Crozatier du Puy-en-Velay.

Sources 

  Simone Hoog, (preface by Jean-Pierre Babelon, with Roland Brossard), Musée national de Versailles. Les sculptures. I- Le musée, Réunion des musées nationaux, Paris, 1993
  Pierre Kjellberg, Le Nouveau guide des statues de Paris, La Bibliothèque des Arts, Paris, 1988
  Emmanuel Schwartz, Les Sculptures de l'École des Beaux-Arts de Paris. Histoire, doctrines, catalogue, École nationale supérieure des Beaux-Arts, Paris, 2003

1798 births
1858 deaths
19th-century French sculptors
French male sculptors
19th-century French male artists